Ronald Magada, professionally known as Maro Uganda, is an Ugandan musician, songwriter and performer, currently based in Bonn Bad godesberg Germany. He is known for his songs, "Mubbi Bubbi" ft David Lutalo, "Rising star", "Kyokoba", "Anjagala" and has done international features like "Chip in" featuring Mark Forster and Maurice Kirya, "Imani" by BSMG, among others.

Music career
Maro launched his music career in 2007, juggling between work at the cineplex cinemas garden city mall kampala, campus and got a breakthrough in 2010 with "Toneraga: ft Empress and Mikie Wine In 2011 he signed with "West end entertainment" of Aziz Azion, a prominent vocalist, writer and guitarist in Uganda and released his first single titled "Sulabulungi" meaning "Good night", a love song. This was followed by the Lusoga (his native language) hit single "Biweewo" meaning getting finished with something; in this case, with obstacles in love. His second collaboration was with Mya Baganda of the Blu*3 in 2012. He later released "Genda Ewamwe" which was one of his major hit songs in 2013 winning him a chance at his first concert that took place Freedom City in September 2013. In the same year he was nominated in the Buzz Teenies Awards and right after the successful concert, he won the award for Best collaboration of the year in the next weeks "Why" featuring Ugandan hip hop star "Gravity Omutujju at the first ever Club Music Video Awards held on the 20th September 2013. He released a single "Rising star" in celebration of his success, speaking about his journey, embedding clips of the awards ceremony and the major concert tours he had by then. He has collaborated with hip hop stars like Navio, GNL ZAMBA, Feffe Bussi, Gravity Omutujjuetc

Studio albums

Early life and educational background
Maro was born in Buwolero village, Kagoma subcounty in Jinja to James Magada and Janet  Babuleka. His father serves in the Uganda Police Force. He is the eldest of 13 children. Maro attended Nsambya Barracks Nursery School, joined St. Peter Nsambya Primary school, did his PLE  at Bupadengo Primary School in Kamuli District, White Land College (currently known as Seroma College) for one year and later joined Light College Mukono doing his UACE. Buloba High School where he sat for his UACE 2006. In 2015, Maro graduated from Makerere University with a bachelor's degree in Development Studies.

Honors

Community works
He is an active member of VIVA CONAGUA  (an international NGO based in Germany) providing clean water, promoting sanitation and proper hygiene through art and sport. He has worked with Uganda Hands For Hope Namuwongo, Uganda Women Cancer Support Organisation, Inter Aid on Refugees and PLAN International (Uganda) with emphasis on empowerment of girls.

References

External links
Instagram
Maro Music, Songs, Videos, Mp3 Downloads and Biography
Maro Biography
Maro Uganda Anjagala Live Concert slated for 14th Feb 2020
INTERVIEW: Singer Maro talks about his new studio
PHOTOS: Singer Maro lights up Unplugged in style – theinsider.ug
Kasuku Is Misleading My Fans- Maro Cries Out
Producers Nase,Bless and singer Maro lead successful ESOM alumni in Uganda's music industry

21st-century Ugandan male singers
Ugandan emigrants to Germany
1987 births
Living people